Campinoti is an Italian surname. Notable people with the surname include:

Nicola Campinoti (born 1992), Italian footballer
Paolo Campinoti (born 1990), Italian footballer

Italian-language surnames